Kevin Holland is a Canadian politician.

Kevin Holland may also refer to:

 Kevin Holland (Australian politician) (1910–1996), Australian politician
 Kevin Holland (fighter) (born 1992), American mixed martial artist

See also

 Kevin Crossley-Holland, (born 1941), British author
 
 Holland (disambiguation)
 Kevin (disambiguation)